Črmošnjice pri Stopičah is a settlement south of Novo Mesto in southeastern Slovenia. The entire City Municipality of Novo Mesto lies in the traditional region of Lower Carniola and is now included in the Southeast Slovenia Statistical Region.

Name
The name of the settlement was changed from Črmošnjice to Črmošnjice pri Stopičah in 1955.

Church
The local church, built outside the village to the north, is dedicated to Mary Magdalene and belongs to the Parish of Stopiče. It dates to the late 16th century.

References

External links
Črmošnjice pri Stopičah on Geopedia

Populated places in the City Municipality of Novo Mesto